Psilotagma decorata is a moth of the family Geometridae first described by William Warren in 1894. It is found in China (Hubei, Gansu, Hunan, Guangxi, Henan, Yunnan, Sichuan, Shaanxi) and Bhutan.

References

Moths described in 1894
Pseudoterpnini